Liu Jiahui (born 25 January 2001) is a Chinese footballer currently playing as a defender for Henan Songshan Longmen.

Career statistics

Club
.

References

2001 births
Living people
Chinese footballers
China youth international footballers
Association football defenders
Chinese Super League players
Henan Songshan Longmen F.C. players